Courland (German and Scandinavian languages: Kurland; /; ; Finnish: Kuurinmaa; Estonian: Kuramaa;) is one of the Historical Latvian Lands in western Latvia. The name probably derives from kur̃t, from kʷer- (to do, to build). The largest city is Liepāja, the third largest city in Latvia. The regions of Semigallia and Selonia are sometimes considered as part of Courland as they were formerly held by the same duke.

Geography and climate 

Situated in western Latvia, Courland roughly corresponds to the former Latvian districts of Kuldīga, Liepāja, Saldus, Talsi, Tukums and Ventspils.

When combined with Semigallia and Selonia, Courland's northeastern boundary is the Daugava, which separates it from the regions of Latgale and Vidzeme. To the north, Courland's coast lies along the Gulf of Riga. On the west it is bordered by the Baltic Sea, and on the south by Lithuania. It lies between 55° 45′ and 57° 45′ North and 21° and 27° East.

The name is also found in the Curonian Spit and Lithuanian Karšuvos giria - the Courland wood.

The landscape generally has a low and undulating character, with flat and marshy coastlands. The interior features wooded dunes, covered with pine, spruce, birch, and oak, with swamps and lakes, and fertile patches between.

The Jelgava plain divides Courland into two parts, the western side, which is fertile and densely inhabited, except in the north, and the eastern side, less fertile and thinly inhabited.

Nearly one hundred rivers drain Courland, but only three of these rivers – the Daugava, the Lielupe and the Venta – are navigable. They all flow northwestward and discharge into the Baltic Sea.

Owing to its numerous lakes and marshes, Courland has a damp, often foggy, and changeable climate; its winters are severe.

History

Early history 
In ancient times the Curonians, a pagan tribe, inhabited Courland. The Brethren of the Sword, a German Catholic military order, subdued the Curonians and converted them to Christianity in the first quarter of the 13th century. Thus in 1230, the Curonian king Lammekinus (Lamiķis) made peace directly with the papal legate. He accepted baptism, and became a vassal of the pope. In 1237 the area passed into the rule of the Teutonic Order owing to the amalgamation of this order with that of the Brethren of the Sword.

Livonian Confederation 

The Livonian Confederation was a loosely organized confederation formed by the German-led Livonian Order and various bishoprics that encompassed much of present-day Estonia and Latvia.  It existed from 1228 to the 1560s, when it was dismembered by the Tsardom of Russia during the Livonian War.

Duchy of Courland and the Polish–Lithuanian Commonwealth, 1561–1795 

The Duchy of Courland and Semigallia was a semi-independent duchy that existed from 1561 until 1795, encompassing the areas of Courland and Semigallia.  Although nominally a vassal state of the Polish–Lithuanian Commonwealth, the dukes operated autonomously. In the 18th century, Russia acquired great influence over the Duchy; the future Empress Anna of Russia served as regent there from 1711 until her accession to the Russian throne in 1730. After the last of the ducal line into which she had married died in 1737, she arranged for the Duchy to be given to her lover, Ernst Johann von Biron instead.

The Duchy was one of the smallest European nations to colonize overseas territories, establishing short-lived outposts on the Caribbean islands of Tobago and Trinidad and at the mouth of the Gambia River in Africa on what was then known as James Island.

In 1795, the last Duke, Peter von Biron, ceded the Duchy to the Russian Empire.

The former Bishopric of Courland was directly incorporated into the Polish–Lithuanian Commonwealth as the District of Pilten of the Wenden and later Inflanty Voivodeship.

Courland as part of the Russian Empire 
After annexation by the Russian Empire, the territory of the former Duchy formed the Courland Governorate.

From the time of the Northern Crusades in the early 13th century, most land was owned by nobles descended from the German invaders. In 1863, the Russian authorities issued laws to enable Latvians, who formed the bulk of the population, to acquire the farms which they held, and special banks were founded to help them. By this means, some occupants bought their farms, but the great mass of the population remained landless, and lived as hired labourers, occupying a low position in the social scale.

Agriculture was the chief occupation, with the principal crops being rye, barley, oats, wheat, flax, and potatoes. The large estates conducted agriculture with skill and scientific knowledge. Fruit grew well. Excellent breeds of cattle, sheep and pigs were kept. Liepāja and Jelgava operated as the principal industrial centres, with ironworks, agricultural machinery works, tanneries, glass and soap works. Flax spinning took place mostly as a domestic industry.  Iron and limestone were the chief minerals; a little amber was found on the coast. The only seaports were Liepāja, Ventspils and Palanga, there being none on the Courland coast of the Gulf of Riga.

Population 

In 1870 the population was 619,154; in 1897 it was 674,437 (of whom 345,756 were women); in 1906 it was estimated at 714,200. Of the whole, 79% were Latvians, 8.4% Baltic Germans, about 8% Jews, 1.4% Russians, 1% Lithuanians, 1% Poles, and some Livonians.

The chief towns of the ten districts were Jelgava (Mitau), Courland's capital (pop. 35,011 in 1897); Liepāja (Libau) (pop. 64,500 in 1897); Bauska (6,543); Jaunjelgava (Friedrichstadt) (5,223); Kuldīga (Goldingen) (9,733); Grobiņa (1,489); Aizpute (Hasenpoth) (3,338); Ilūkste (Illuxt) (2,340); Talsi (Talsen) (6,215); Tukums (Tuckum) (7542); and Ventspils (Windau) (7,132).

75% of the population belonged to the prevailing denomination, Lutheranism; the rest belonged to the Eastern Orthodox and Roman Catholic churches. There was a small but vigorous Jewish population.

Courland during and after World War I 

During World War I, Courland formed part of the Eastern Front theatre of operations that saw fighting primarily between forces of the Russian and German Empires.  Following Russia's Great Retreat of 1915, Courland came under the control of the Imperial German Army's Ober Ost commander in the person of Paul von Hindenburg, a Prussian military hero.  (The Russian authorities of the Courland Governorate were exiled to Tartu, never to return.)  With large territories coming under the Ober Ost's administration as a result of military successes on the Eastern Front, General Erich Ludendorff was charged with managing the large area now under its jurisdiction.  Courland District (which included parts of Semigallia) was made one of three districts of the region, which also came to be known as Ober Ost.

As Russian rule in the rest of what is now Latvia began collapsing at the end of World War I, Baltic Germans began a process of forming provincial councils between September 1917 and March 1918, competing with ethnic Latvians' moves toward independence.  With the Treaty of Brest-Litovsk of 3 March 1918, the new Russian Soviet Federative Socialist Republic formally relinquished control of Courland to Germany. The Duchy of Courland and Semigallia was proclaimed on 8 March 1918 by a Baltic German Landesrat, who offered the crown of the duchy to German Kaiser Wilhelm II. Wilhelm recognised the duchy as a German vassal that same month. However, the duchy was absorbed on 22 September 1918 by the United Baltic Duchy.

On 18 November 1918, Latvia proclaimed its independence and on 7 December 1918, the German military handed over authority to the pro-German Latvian Provisional Government headed by Kārlis Ulmanis. By January 1919, much of Courland had been overrun by the Bolsheviks' Latvian Socialist Soviet Republic, but the provisional government with the aid of German forces pushed back and took back Courland by April. Throughout the Latvian War of Independence, much of Courland remained a German stronghold. Latvia eventually signed a cease-fire with Germany on 15 July 1920, and the Latvian–Soviet Peace Treaty of 11 August ended the war.

Courland as part of interbellum Latvia 
After World War I, Courland became one of five provinces of the newly formed nation of Latvia. These provinces corresponded to Latvia's four traditional regions plus Riga.

Courland during and after World War II 

The Soviet Army occupied Latvia in conformity with the terms of 1939 Molotov–Ribbentrop Pact on 17 June 1940.  On 5 August 1940, the Soviet Union annexed the region along with the rest of Latvia which was made a constituent republic of the USSR, the Latvian SSR.

At the start of Operation Barbarossa in the summer of 1941, the German Wehrmacht's Army Group North headed by Field Marshal Wilhelm Ritter von Leeb overran Courland, along with the rest of the Baltic littoral. In 1944 the Red Army lifted the siege of Leningrad and re-conquered the Baltic area along with much of Ukraine and Belarus.  However, some 200,000 German troops held out in Courland. With their backs to the Baltic Sea, they remained trapped in what became known as the Courland Pocket, blockaded by the Red Army and by the Red Baltic Fleet. Colonel-General Heinz Guderian, the Chief of the German General Staff, pleaded with  Adolf Hitler to allow evacuation of the troops in Courland by sea for use in the defense of Germany. Hitler refused and ordered the Wehrmacht, Waffen-SS, Luftwaffe and Kriegsmarine forces in Courland to continue the defense of the area. Germany’s naval capacity to evacuate these forces was restricted as it needed the majority of its transport ships to evacuate troops from East Prussia and maintain vital trade with Sweden. On January 15, 1945, Army Group Courland (Heeresgruppe Kurland) formed under Colonel-General Dr. Lothar Rendulic. The blockade by elements of the Leningrad Front remained until May 8, 1945, when  Army Group Courland, then under its last commander, Colonel-General Carl Hilpert, surrendered to Marshal Leonid Govorov, the commander of the Leningrad Front (reinforced by elements of the 2nd Baltic Front) on the Courland perimeter. At this time the group consisted of the remnants of some 31 divisions. After May 9, 1945, approximately 203,000 troops of Army Group Courland began to be moved to Soviet prison camps to the east. The majority of them never returned to Germany (Haupt, 1997).

Courland remained part of the Latvian SSR within the Soviet Union following World War II.  Courland was no longer an administrative unit under the Soviets but an early Liepāja Oblast, one of three oblasts in Latvia, roughly corresponded to Courland.

With the dissolution of the Soviet Union, Courland became part of independent Latvia once more and it remains so to this day. The remainder of Courland is part of the planning regions of Riga and Semigallia (Zemgale).

Notable residents 
Ephraim Deinard (1846–1930), born in Valdemārpils, publisher and author.
George Henry Loskiel (1740–1814), born in Angermuende in Courland, Moravian clergyman who obtained complete separation of the European and American branches of the church.
Otto Mears, (1840–1931), pioneering road and railway builder in Colorado, United States; born in Courland.
Dorothea von Medem (1761–1821), Duchess of Courland, wife of the last Duke of Courland.

See also

 Elisa von der Recke

Notes

References 
 Murray, John, Russia, Poland, and Finland, – Handbook for Travellers, 3rd revised edition, London, 1875. (Includes Kurland).
 Hollmann, H, Kurlands Agrarverhältnisse, Riga, 1893.
 Seraphim, E, Geschichte Liv-, Esth-, und Kurlands,  Reval, 1895–1896 (2 vols).
 Christiansen, Eric, The Northern Crusades – the Baltic & the Catholic Frontier 1100–1525, London, 1980, 
 Hiden, John, The Baltic States and Weimar Ostpolitik, Cambridge University Press, 1987, 
 Kirby, David, Northern Europe in the Early Modern Period – The Baltic World 1492 -1772, Longman, London, 1990, 
 Hiden, John W., & Patrick Salmon, The Baltic Nations & Europe, Longman, London, 1991, 
 Haupt, Werner, Army Group North: The Wehrmacht in Russia 1941–1945, Schiffer Publishing, Atglen, PA., 1997. 
 Kauffmann, Jean-Paul, A Journey to Nowhere: Detours and Riddles in the Lands and History of Courland, MacLehose Press, 2012

External links 

Courland (Kurland) / Kurzeme
Courland
 Courland 1641–1795
Kurland Winter
Ritterschaften der Familie in Kurland 

 
Geography of Latvia
Subdivisions of Latvia
Historical regions in Latvia